The Belarusian National Road Race Championships is a cycling race where the Belarusian cyclists decide who will become the champion for the year to come.

Multiple winners

Men

Women

Men

Elite

Source:

U23

Women

Source:

See also
Belarusian National Time Trial Championships
National Road Cycling Championships

References

National road cycling championships
Cycle races in Belarus
Cycling